Hasties Swamp is a national park in Queensland, Australia, 1,371 km northwest of Brisbane. The swamp is located several kilometres south of the town of Atherton in Far North Queensland. The main feature of the park is a seasonal wetland. Part of the swamp was first declared a national park on 5 April 1980.

Habitat protected within the park supports up to 300 species of birds. These include the sarus crane, pale-vented bush-hen and buff-banded rail.

A bird hide provides viewing opportunities for visitors, including those using wheelchairs.

The wetland is surrounded by open eucalypt forest. The average elevation of the terrain is 826 metres.

See also

 Protected areas of Queensland

References

External links
 Hasties Swamp National Park

National parks of Far North Queensland
Protected areas established in 1980